Gerhard Weidner (15 March 1933 – 25 September 2021) was a West German race walker. He was born in Magdeburg. He represented his country three times at the Summer Olympics, competing in the 50 kilometres walk in 1968 and 1972, then the 20 kilometres walk at the 1976 Summer Olympics. His best finish on the international stage was a silver medal at the 1975 IAAF World Race Walking Cup.

Achievements

References

1933 births
2021 deaths
West German male racewalkers
Sportspeople from Magdeburg
Athletes (track and field) at the 1968 Summer Olympics
Athletes (track and field) at the 1972 Summer Olympics
Athletes (track and field) at the 1976 Summer Olympics
Olympic athletes of West Germany